The following is a list of current governors (or mayor) of U.S. states, territories, and the federal district. In the United States, a governor is the chief executive officer of a  state or a territory. As of January 18, 2023, there are 26 states with Republican governors and 24 states with Democratic governors. Additionally, four U.S. territories have Democratic governors, while one has an independent governor. Pedro Pierluisi of Puerto Rico is a member of the New Progressive Party, although he is also affiliated with the Democratic Party. Minnesota has a governor from the Democratic-Farmer-Labor Party. The federal District of Columbia is governed by a Democratic mayor.

State governors 
The current term ends and new term begins in January of the given year for every state except for Alaska, Hawaii, North Dakota, New York and Kentucky, where the term ends in December of that year's election. The notation "(term limits)" after the year indicates that the current governor is ineligible to seek re-election in that year; the notation "(retiring)" indicates that the current governor has announced his or her intention not to seek re-election at the end of the term nor to run for another office. Currently, the longest serving incumbent U.S. governor is Jay Inslee of Washington, having served since January 2013, and the most recently inaugurated governor is Wes Moore of Maryland, having served since January 18, 2023. In terms of age, Alabama governor Kay Ivey (born 1944) is the oldest governor, and Arkansas governor Sarah Huckabee Sanders (born 1982) is the youngest.

Territory governors 
The following hold the gubernatorial offices of the United States territories.

Federal district mayor

See also 
 Flags of governors of the U.S. states
 List of current United States first spouses
 List of current United States governors by age
 List of current United States lieutenant governors
 List of female governors in the United States
 List of minority governors and lieutenant governors in the United States
 List of United States state legislatures
 List of U.S. state governors born outside the United States
 National Governors Association
 Seals of governors of the U.S. states

Notes

References

External links 

 National Governors Association

 Current
United States governors
Governors

id:Daftar gubernur di Amerika Serikat
he:מושל (ארצות הברית)